The Roman Catholic Diocese of Geneva was a Latin Catholic diocese in part of Switzerland and Savoy from 400 to 1801 when it merged with the Diocese of Chambéry. The merged diocese later lost Swiss territory to the Catholic Diocese of Lausanne, Geneva and Fribourg.

History
Geneva was first recorded as a border town, fortified against the Helvetii (Celto-Germanic people). In 120 BC, Geneva was conquered by the Romans. In 443 AD, Geneva became part of the Kingdom of Burgundy. In 534 AD, it fell to the Franks. In 888 AD, Geneva was returned to the Kingdom of Burgundy. In 1033, it was taken into the Kingdom of Germany.

The position of the first Bishop of Geneva is ascribed to multiple individuals. Gregorio Leti (1630  1701) and Besson, wrote of the legend that Geneva was Christianised by Dionysius the Areopagite and Paracodus, two of the seventy-two disciples, in the time of Domitian (51  91 AD). Paracodus legendarily became the first Bishop of Geneva. However, this is based on an error of language. The Catalogue de St. Pierre, which records that Diogenes was the first Bishop of Geneva, is untrustworthy. A letter from St. Eucherius to Salvius indicates that St. Isaac of Monteluco (c. 400 AD) was the first Bishop of Geneva. Another legend holds that Lazarus of Bethany (Saint Lazarus) was the first Bishop of Geneva.

In 440 AD, a record suggests St. Salonius may have been the Bishop of Geneva. Salonius was the son of St. Eucherius. Eucherius dedicated his "Instructiones" to Salonius. Salonius took part in the Council of Orange (441 AD) and in the Councils of Vaison (442 AD) and Arles (c. 455 AD). Salonius may have authored two small commentaries, In Parabolas Salomonis and On Ecclesiastics.

Little is known about the bishops who followed Salonius. Theoplastus (c. 475 AD) was the recipient of a letter from St. Sidonius Apollinaris. When Dormitianus (before 500 AD) was bishop, Princess Sedeleuba van Bourgondië, a sister of Queen Clotilde, had the remains of the martyr, St. Victor of Solothurn moved to Geneva. Sedeleuba built a basilica in the martyr's honor. Maximus of Geneva (c. 512  541 AD), corresponded with Avitus, Archbishop of Vienne and Cyprian of Toulon. In 541 AD, Bishop Pappulus sent Thoribiusas, a priest, to represent him at the Fourth Council of Orléans. Bishop Salonius II is only known from his signatures at the Synod of Lyons (570 AD) and the Synod of Paris (573 AD). In 584 AD, Cariatto was made Bishop of Geneva by King Guntram. In 585 AD, Bishop Cariatto attended the synod of Valence and the Synod of Macon.

The Bishopric (office of bishop) of Geneva was a suffragan (subordinate) of the Archbishopric of Vienne. From 1154, the bishops of Geneva had the status of Prince of the Holy Roman Empire. However, their independence was curtailed by the advocati (the ecclesiastical overseers appointed by the archbishop), the Counts of Geneva and later, the Counts of Savoy.

In 1290, the Counts of Savoy obtained the right to elect the Bishop of Geneva's Vidame (bishop's lieutenant). François de Candie of Chambéry-Le-Vieux was one such Vidame.

In 1387, Bishop Adhémar Fabry granted Geneva its charter ensuring the city's rights and institutional continuity. Subsequent bishops were expected to affirm the charter.

In 1394, the Counts of Geneva's line ended with no further issue. The House of Savoy sought to take its place. After 1416, members of the House of Savoy took the title "Duke". They maneuvered to elevate their members to the Bishop of Geneva's diocesan staff. The City of Geneva responded by making an alliance with the Old Swiss Confederacy, an Eidgenossenschaft. In 1526, Geneva aligned with Berne and Fribourg.

In the 16th century, the Protestant Reformation caused great change in the religious and political life of Geneva. Prior to the reformation, the Diocese of Geneva extended well into Savoy, as far as Mont Cenis and the Great St Bernard Pass. It also included Nyon. However, under the rule of Charlemagne (742  814) Tarantaise was detached from Geneva to form a separate diocese. The bishops of Geneva ruled over 8 chapters, 423 parishes, 9 abbeys and 68 priories.

During the Reformation, the City of Berne supported the Protestant Reformers, including William Farel (1489  1565) and Antoine Froment (1508  1581). The City of Fribourg supported the Catholic Church and in 1531, renounced its alliance with Geneva. In 1536, John Calvin (1509  1564) went to Geneva, but was expelled after disagreement over details of the Easter eucharist. He returned to Geneva in 1541 and lived there until his death. Geneva became a stronghold of Calvinism. In 1532, the Bishop of Geneva was removed from his seat. In 1535, he established his see in Annecy and in 1536 at Gex. Francis de Sales (1567  1622) was Bishop of Geneva. He held the position from 1602 to 1621. Through his devotion, many in the diocese returned to Catholicism.

In 1802, under the rule of Napoleon, the Diocese was annexed to France and united with the Diocese of Chambéry. In 1814, at the Congress of Vienna Geneva was extended to cover 15 Savoyard and 6 French parishes. This included 16,000 people of the Catholic faith. Geneva was also admitted to the Swiss Confederation. The Congress of Vienna and the Treaty of Turin (1816) provided protection to the Catholic religion in Geneva.

In 1819, Pope Pius VII united the City of Geneva and twenty parishes with the Diocese of Lausanne. In 1822, the area belonging to the Diocese of Geneva but beyond the borders of Switzerland became the Diocese of Annecy. The Cantonal Council abandoned previous agreements. In imitation of the French Organic Articles (laws regarding public worship) the Cantonal Council requested a placet (an acceptance by civil authorities of canon law).

Etienne Marilley (1804–1889) became the parish priest of Geneva in 1831 and was ordained bishop in 1846. This was the time of Kulturkampf. For instance, discord arose concerning public financial support for the Protestant and Old Catholic Churches, while the Catholic Church received none. On 30 June 1907, Geneva voted for the separation of church and state.

Episcopal ordinaries
(all Roman Rite)
Suffragan Bishops of Geneva (Genf, Genève) 
 Hugo (993–1020)
 Bernardus (1020–1030)
 Adalgod (1020–1030)
 Konrad (1020–1030)
 Fridericus (1030–1073)
 Boczadus (1073–1083)
 Guy de Faucigny (1083–1119)
 Humbert de Grammont (1120–1135)
 Arducius de Faucigny (1135–1185)
 Nantelmus (1185–1205)
 Bernard Chabert (1205–1213)
 Pierre de Sessons (1213–1213)
 Aymo de Grandson (1215–1260)
 Heinrich (1260–1267)
 Aymon de Cruseilles (1268–1275)
 Robert de Genève (1276–1287)
 Guillaume de Conflans (1287–1294)
 Martin de Saint-Germain (1295–1303)
 Aimone de Quart (1304–1311)
 Pierre de Faucigny (1311–1342)
 Alamand de Saint-Jeoire (1342–1366)
 Guillaume de Marcossey (1366–1377)
 Jean de Murol was born in France. From 27 January 1378 to 12 July 1385, he was the next Apostolic Administrator of Roman Catholic Diocese of Saint-Paul-Trois-Châteaux in France. From 12 July 1385 to 23 December 1388, he was also the Pseudocardinal-Priest of Ss. Vitale, Valeria, Gervasio e Protasio and remained in that role until his death on 10 February 1399.
 Adhémar Fabri de La Roche. Fabri de La Roche was a member of the Dominican Order from 12 July 1385 until his death on 8 October 1388. Between 13 November 1363 and 10 November 1378, he was Bishop of Bethléem à Clamecy. Between 10 November 1378 and 12 July 1385, he was Bishop of Saint-Paul-Trois-Châteaux.
 Guillaume di Lornay (1388–1408)
 Jean de Bertrand (1408–1418)
 Jean de la Rochetaillée was an apostolic administrator from 23 September 1418 to 12 June 1422. From 13 July 1412 to 26 June 1423, he was the Latin Patriarch of Constantinople. During this period, from 12 June 1422 to 26 June 1423, Rochetaillee was also the canonical bishop of the Diocese of Paris. From 26 June 1423 to 24 May 1426, he was the Metropolitan Archbishop of Rouen. From 24 May 1426 until 1431 he served as the Apostolic Administrator of Rouen and was the Cardinal-Priest of San Lorenzo in Lucina from 27 May 1426 until his death on 24 March 1437. His other roles in this period included Archpriest of Papal Basilica of St. Mary Major from January 1428, Apostolic Administrator of Archdiocese of Besançon from 14 October 1429 to 24 March 1437 and Vice-Chancellor of the Apostolic Chancery from 1434 to 24 March 1437.
 Jean Courtecuisse (1422.06.12–1423), previously Bishop of Paris (France) (1421.06.16–1422.06.12)
 Apostolic Administrator Pseudocardinal Jean Allarmet de Brogny (1423.12.03–death 1426.02.16) while Pseudo-Cardinal-Bishop of Ostia–Velletri (1405.06.13–1426.02.16); previously canonical Bishop of Viviers (France) (1382.08.11 – 1385.07.12), uncanonical PseudoCardinal-Priest of S. Anastasia (1385.07.12–1405.06.13), uncanonical Vice-Chancellor of Apostolic Chancery (1391–1417), uncanonical Protopriest of Sacred College of Cardinals (1404.05–1405.06.13), canonical Metropolitan Archbishop of Arles (France) (1410–1412.12.03), canonical Chancellor of Apostolic Chancery (1417–1421) 
 François de Meez, Benedictine Congregation of Cluny (O.S.B. Clun.) (born France) (1426.03.04 – death 1444.03.07); also uncanonical Pseudocardinal-Priest of S. Marcello (1440.10.02  444.03.07)
 uncanonical Apostolic Administrator Amedeo di Savoie (1444.03–1451.01.07) while Antipope Felix V (1439.11.05 [1440.07.24] – 1449.04.07); later canonical Cardinal-Bishop of Suburbicarian Diocese of Sabina (1449.04.23–death 1451.01.07)
 Pierre de Savoie (1451 – 1458)
 Jean-Louis de Savoie (1460 – 1482)
 Auxiliary Bishop: Mamerto Fichet (1470–?), Titular Bishop of Hebron (1470–?)
 Cardinal Domenico della Rovere (born Italy) (1482.07.19–1482.07.24), while Cardinal-Priest of S. Clemente (1479.08.13–death 1501.04.22), Bishop of Montefiascone (1479.08.24–1491.04.22) and Bishop of Corneto (Italy) (1479.08.24–1491.04.22); next Bishop of Torino (Turin, Piedmont, Italy) (1482.07.24 – retired 1497); previously Cardinal-Priest of Ss. Vitale, Valeria, Gervasio e Protasio (1478.02.10–1479.08.13) and Metropolitan Archbishop of Tarentaise (France) (1478.02.11–1482.07.24)
 Jean de Compey (1482.07.24–1482)
 François de Savoie (1484–1490)
 Antoine Champion (1490.11.05–1495), previously Bishop of Mondovì (Italy) (1484.11.26–1490.11.05)
 Philippe de Savoie (1495–1509)
 Charles de Seyssel (1509–1513)
 Jean de Savoie (1513–1522)
 Pierre de La Baume (born France) (1522.10.10–1543), also Coadjutor Archbishop of Besançon (France) (1530.07.13–1541.12.29), created Cardinal-Priest of Santi Giovanni e Paolo (1541.11.21–1544.05.04), succeeded as Metropolitan Archbishop of Besançon (1541.12.29–1543.06.27)
 Louis de Rye (1543–1550)
 Philibert de Rye (1550–1556)
 François de Bachod (1556–1568)
 Ange Justiniani (1568–1578)
 Claude de Granier (1578–1602)
 Saint Bishop François de Sales  (born France) (1602.09.17–death 1622.12.28), also Founder of the nuns Order of the Visitation of Holy Mary (Visitandines) (1610.06.06); succeeded as previous Bishop-elect Titular Bishop of Nicopolis (1602.07.15–1602.09.17) and Coadjutor Bishop of Genève (1602.07.15–1602.09.17)
 Jean-François de Sales (1622.12.28–death 1635.06.08), succeeded as previous Titular Bishop of Chalcedon (1620.10.12–1622.12.28) and Coadjutor Bishop of Geneva (1620.10.12–1622.12.28)
 Juste Guérin (1639.03.28–death 1645.11.03)
 Charles-Auguste de Sales (1645.11.03–death 1660.02.08), succeeded as former Titular Bishop of Hebron (1644.12.19–1645.11.03) and Coadjutor Bishop of Geneva (Switzerland) (1644.12.19–1645.11.03)
 Jean d’Arenthon d’Alex (1661.07.04–death 1695.07.03)
 Michel-Gabriel de Rossillon de Bernex (1697.08.26–death 1734.04.23)
 Joseph-Nicolas Deschamps di Chaumont (born France) (1741.04.17–death 1763.11.02)
 Jean-Pierre Biord (1764.07.09–death 1785.03.07)
 Joseph-Marie Paget (1787.04.23–retired 1802.02.04), died 1810
 Apostolic Administrator François-Thérèse Panisseta (1793–1794) no other office
 René des Monstiers de Mérinville (1802.05.04–retired 1805.02.07), died 1829; previously Bishop of Dijon (France) ([1787.02.25] 1787.04.23–1801.12.02), Bishop of Chambéry (France) ([1802.04.09] 1802.05.04–1805.02.07)
 Irénée-Yves de Solle (1805–1821).

See also
 List of Catholic dioceses in Switzerland
 Roman Catholic Diocese of Lausanne, Geneva and Fribourg, which indirectly inherited its territory and adopted its title without direct link

References

Sources and external links
 GCatholic
 Bibliography
 lemma 'Diocesi di Ginevra', in Dizionario storico della Svizzera.
 Le diocèse de Genève-Annecy, edit. Henri Baud, Histoire des diocèses de France 19, Beauchesne, Paris 1985
 Jean-Barthélemy Hauréau, Gallia christiana, vol. XVI, Paris 1865, coll. 373-508
 Louis Duchesne, Fastes épiscopaux de l'ancienne Gaule, vol. I, Paris 1907, pp. 225–230
Cronotassi da Helvetia sacra
 Konrad Eubel, Hierarchia Catholica Medii Aevi, vol. 1, pp. 260–261; vol. 2, p. 158; vol. 3, p. 201; vol. 4, p. 193; vol. 5, p. 208; vol. 6, pp. 223–224
 Breves Inter multiplices and Temporum vices, in Bullarii romani continuatio, Vol. XV, pp. 246–248viz. pp. 370–371

Former Roman Catholic dioceses in Europe